Parachernes sabulosus is a species of pseudoscorpion in the subgenus, Parachernes, of the subfamily Chernetinae, and was first described as Chelifer sabulosus by Albert Tullgren in 1909 from a specimen collected on Dirk Hartog Island.

References 

Animals described in 1909
Chernetidae
Arachnids of Australia